The 1922–23 Campeonato de Portugal was the second edition of Campeonato de Portugal. It was contested by 6 clubs, winners of regional championships, and took place from 3 to 24 June 1923.

FC Porto, the defending champions, were eliminated by Sporting CP in the semi-finals.

The winners were Sporting CP, who defeated Académica by 3–0 in the final.

Format
The winners of six regional championships were qualified to this competition: Algarve FA's, Braga FA's, Coimbra FA's, Lisbon FA's, Madeira FA's and Porto FA's. This represents an increase in the number of clubs compared to the previous season, which had only the winners of Lisbon FA and Porto FA.

All matches are played on a single-leg, at a neutral venue, with extra time and penalties if necessary.  Only Braga FA's and Coimbra FA's clubs play the first round; Algarve FA's club enter on the second round and Lisbon FA's, Madeira FA's and Porto FA's enter on the semi-finals.

Teams
 Algarve FA winner: Lusitano VRSA
 Braga FA winner: Braga
 Coimbra FA winner: Académica
 Lisbon FA winner: Sporting CP
 Madeira FA winner: Marítimo
 Porto FA winner: FC Porto

First round

Second round

Semi-finals

Final

Bracket

See also
 1923 Campeonato de Portugal Final

References

External links
 thefinalball.com

Campeonato de Portugal (1922–1938)
Port
1922–23 in Portuguese football